Debonair (1996–99) was a British airline which operated mainly from London Luton Airport offering flights to and from Spain, France, Germany and Italy. It ceased operations in October 1999 due to financial difficulties.

History

Debonair was founded in 1996 by Franco Mancassola and on its first day of operations offered all passengers free flights.  Initial destinations from Luton were Newcastle upon Tyne, Copenhagen, Mönchengladbach, Munich, Barcelona and Nice.  The latter two destinations were in direct competition with EasyJet. The Newcastle and Copenhagen flights were dropped, with new destinations of Rome, Paris Pontoise, Madrid and Perugia added.  From the beginning, Debonair tried to be a more upmarket version of the traditional budget airlines and in 1998 introduced ABC (short for "Affordable Business Class") on some of its routes.

It floated shares on the Easdaq stock exchange in July 1997 and raised £25m. The Debonair business concept of offering budget airline travel, whilst keeping the frills (free drinks and snacks) associated with national carriers, was not a financial success. On 1 October 1999 the airline ceased operations due to financial problems.

Fleet
Debonair operated a fleet of used BAe 146-200 aircraft, later supplemented by three Boeing 737-300s and a leased BAC One-Eleven.

See also
 List of defunct airlines of the United Kingdom

References

External links

Defunct airlines of the United Kingdom
Airlines established in 1996